The 1880 United States presidential election in Virginia took place on November 2, 1880, as part of the 1880 United States presidential election. Voters chose 11 representatives, or electors to the Electoral College, who voted for president and vice president.

Virginia voted for the Democratic candidate, Major General Winfield S. Hancock over the Republican candidate, U.S. Representative James A. Garfield. Hancock won Virginia comfortably by a margin of 21.05 percent. This is the last occasion the Democratic Party has carried Floyd County, which along with neighbouring Carroll County were to be strong GOP counties in a Democrat-dominated state during the next 7 decades.

While Hancock won the state, a split in the Democratic Party in Virginia over the payment of state debts led to 2 Democratic electoral slates being nominated, 1 by the regular debt-paying "Funder" Democrats, the other by the "Readjuster" or anti-debt paying faction of the party.  Both slates were pledged to the Hancock ticket. The Readjuster ticket received 31,527 votes, but the Funder Democrats took 96,449 votes, enough to defeat the Republicans, whose slate had 84,020.

Results

Results by county

References

Virginia
1880
1880 Virginia elections